Michel Le Royer (31 August 1932 – 25 February 2022) was a French actor, known for his roles in La Fayette, Nutty, Naughty Chateau, and Her Harem. He died on 25 February 2022, at the age of 89.

Selected filmography
 Good Lord Without Confession (1953)

References

1932 births
2022 deaths
People from Orne
French male actors
French male film actors
French National Academy of Dramatic Arts alumni
Chevaliers of the Légion d'honneur